Canyonville Academy (CA), previously known as Canyonville Bible Academy (CBA), is a private Christian boarding school in Canyonville, Oregon, United States. International students make up 70% of the school's body. CCA was founded in 1923. The school has been accredited through Cognia and is a part of the Association of Christian Schools International since 1979, and through Northwest Association of Accredited Schools since 1998.

History

Austin Monroe Shaffer
The school was founded in 1924 by Reverend A.M. Shaffer. The school transitioned into a four-year boarding high school, with its first graduating class of two students (one of whom was Shaffer's son Robert) in 1932. The school became a grades 9-12 high school in 1935.  A.M. Shaffer was the head of the school till 1961.  The son of the founder Robert Shaffer was COO of the school from 1961 to 1965, and president of the school from 1965 till 1985.

Seminar class

Roger Shaffer (grandson of A. M. Shaffer) teaches a culture class at the school called Seminar which is designed to expose  students to different cultural experiences such as plays, operas, and museums.  The class also included a section on investing, and has actively participated in managing a portfolio for the school. In 2013 the class won a national paper trading contest sponsored by SIFMA, with two of CCA's portfolios placing in the top five.

Eleven Nigerian survivors of the Chibok kidnapping have come to Oregon to continue their studies at the Canyonville Avademy.

School Closed 
As of June 28, 2022, landsearch.com listed the property in a pending sale in the amount of $4,400,000.

Pilot athletics
The Canyonville  athletic program is a member of the Oregon School Activities Association.  Their mascot name is known as the Pilots in honor of the pilots of maritime vehicles in the oceans, lakes and rivers. They are a 2A school that compete in the Mountain View Conference.

Notable alumni

 Doug Wead – Special assistant to president George H.W. Bush (senior White House staff)
 Canyonville Academy alumnus and retiring President Doug Wead, is a bestselling author and advisor to two American presidents. He will serve as President Emeritus to the College Preparatory, Christian Boarding High schoolDr. Dan Johnson – President Toledo University (Ohio). Provost Zayed University (United Arab Emirates)
 Dr. Denny Davis – President Northwest University (Washington)
 Dr. Dave Johnston – President/Founder Wesley Institute (Australia), college of arts and ministry; conductor and concert violinist
 Wes Bishop – Screenwriter of 13 movies
 Robert Bruce Williams – American Painter – portraitist
 Rose Gilbert – National high school track/athletics record holder (pentathlon)
 Rev. Don Stewart – Through his organization, founder of more than 1,000 churches in Republic of the Philippines
 Bill Stallings – Member of the United States Electoral College
 Rev. Jim Andrews – Head of Assembly of God missions for Republic of China (Taiwan)
 Dan Carpenter– Nuclear Engineer
 Dr. Mike Webster– Professor of Cardiac Rehabilitation
 Dr Gurion Lantz – Pioneer in utero surgeon
 Jenn Johnson – Musician (Bethel Music)
 Richard Wang – CEO of Coding Dojo

References

External links
 Canyonville Academy official website
 CCA Alumni

Boarding schools in Oregon
High schools in Douglas County, Oregon
Educational institutions established in 1924
Christian schools in Oregon
Canyonville, Oregon
Private high schools in Oregon
1924 establishments in Oregon